The 1960 All-SEC football team consists of American football players selected to the All-Southeastern Conference (SEC) chosen by various selectors for the 1960 NCAA University Division football season.

All-SEC selections

Ends
Johnny Brewer, Ole Miss (AP-1, UPI-1)
Pat Patchen, Florida (AP-2, UPI-1)
Tom Hutchinson, Kentucky (AP-1, UPI-3)
Gerald Burch, Georgia Tech (AP-2, UPI-2)
Cotton Letner, Tennessee (UPI-2)
Mickey Mangham, LSU (UPI-3)

Tackles
Ken Rice, Auburn (AP-1, UPI-1)
Billy Shaw, Georgia Tech (AP-1, UPI-1)
Billy Wilson, Auburn (AP-2, UPI-2)
Bob Benton, Ole Miss (AP-2, UPI-3)
Walter Suggs, Miss. St. (UPI-2)
Ed N., Georgia Tech (UPI-3)

Guards
Vic Miranda, Florida (AP-1, UPI-1)
Richard Price, Ole Miss (AP-1, UPI-2)
Pat Dye, Georgia (AP-2, UPI-1)
Roy Winston, LSU (AP-2)
Billy Neighbors, Alabama (UPI-2)
Ed McC., LSU (UPI-3)
Lloyd H., Kentucky (UPI-3)

Centers
Tom Goode, Miss. St. (AP-1, UPI-1)
Charles Strange, LSU (AP-2, UPI-2)
Cody B., Vanderbilt (UPI-3)

Quarterbacks
Fran Tarkenton, Georgia (College Football Hall of Fame) (AP-1, UPI-1)
Jake Gibbs, Ole Miss (AP-1, UPI-1)

Halfbacks
Tommy Mason, Tulane (AP-1, UPI-1)
Larry Libertore, Florida (AP-2, UPI-2)
Fred Brown, Georgia (AP-2, UPI-2)
Billy Williamson, Georgia Tech (AP-2, UPI-2)
Jim Anderson, Ole Miss (AP-2, UPI-3)
Glenn Glass, Tennessee (UPI-2)
Calvin Bird, Kentucky (UPI-3)
Don R., Florida (UPI-3)
Chick G., Georgia Tech (UPI-3)

Fullbacks
Ed Dyas, Auburn (College Football Hall of Fame) (AP-1, UPI-1)

Key

AP = Associated Press

UPI = United Press International

Bold = Consensus first-team selection by both AP and UPI

See also
1960 College Football All-America Team

References

All-SEC
All-SEC football teams